State Highway 4 (SH 4) is a state highway in West Bengal, India.

Route
SH 4 originates from Jhalda at the junction with SH 4A and passes through Baghmundi, Balarampur, Barabazar, Barabhum, Sindri, Manbazar, Khatra, Raipur Bazar, Sarenga, Pingboni, Goaltore, Nayabasat, Chandrakona Road, Chandrakona, Khirpai, Ghatal, Daspur, Panskura, Tamluk, Nandakumar, Math Chandipur, Kismat Bajkul, Brajalalchak, Khejuri, Marishda, Daisai, Contai,  Bara Bankuya, Ramnagar and terminates at Digha at the crossing with SH 57 (Odisha) near Old Digha Sea Beach.

Districts traversed by SH 4 are:
Purulia district (0 - 115 km)Bankura district (115 - 195 km)Paschim Medinipur (195 - 303 km)Purba Medinipur (303 - 466 km)

Rivers crossed by SH 4 are: Kangsabati, Haldi

Road sections
It is divided into different sections as follows:

See also
List of state highways in West Bengal

External links

References

Transport in Digha
State Highways in West Bengal